The CFDICT project was started by David Houstin in 2010 and is maintained by a team on Chine Informations, with the aim to provide a complete Chinese to French dictionary with pronunciation in pinyin for the Chinese characters.

Content 

CFDICT is a text file; other programs (or simply Notepad or egrep or equivalent) are needed to search and display it. This project is considered a standard Chinese-French reference on the Internet and is used by several other Chinese-French projects.  The Pleco Software uses CFDICT data for its Chinese-French Dictionary.

Features:
 Traditional Chinese and Simplified Chinese
 Pinyin
 French
 , it had 50,580 entries  in UTF-8.

The basic format of the CFDICT.xml file is:
<word>
     <id>1</id>
     <upd>1365432188</upd>
     <trad>中國</trad>
     <simp>中国</simp>
     <py>Zhong1 guo2</py>
     <trans>
          <fr>Chine</fr>
          <fr>Empire du Milieu</fr>
          ...
     </trans>
</word>
...

The format of the CFDICT.u8 file is:
 Traditionnel Simplifié [pin1 yin1] /Traduction française 1/Traduction française 2/
 中國 中国 [Zhong1 guo2] /Chine/Empire du Milieu/

Related projects 

 HanDeDict (Chinese entries)
 CEDICT for English

External links 
  https://chine.in/mandarin/dictionnaire/CFDICT/ Project home page
 CFDICT SQL Creator
  Chinese-French Dictionary for Android (by Chine Information with CFDICT)

References

Chinese dictionaries
Translation dictionaries